Praeepischnia is a genus of snout moths.

Species
Praeepischnia lydella (Lederer, 1865)
Praeepischnia nevadensis (Rebel, 1910)
Praeepischnia taftanella Amsel, 1954

References

Phycitini
Pyralidae genera